The Empress of Dreams is a collection of fantasy short stories by British author Tanith Lee. It was first published in trade paperback and ebook by DMR Books in February 2021.

Summary
The book collects sixteen short works by the author in the Sword and Sorcery subgenre.

Contents
"Odds Against the Gods" (from Swords Against Darkness II, Sep. 1977)
"Sleeping Tiger" (from Dragonbane no. 1, Spring 1978)
"The Demoness" (from The Year's Best Fantasy Stories: 2, 1976)
"The Sombrus Tower" (from Weird Tales 2, 1980)
"Winter White" (from The Year's Best Horror Stories: Series VI, 1978)
"In the Balance" (from Swords Against Darkness III, 1978)
"Northern Chess" (from Amazons!, 1979)
"Southern LIghts" (from Amazons II, 1982)
"Mirage and Magia" (from Hecate's Cauldron, 1982)
"The Three Brides of Hamid-Dar" (from Arabesques 2, 1989)
"The Pain of Glass" (from Clockwork Phoenix 2, 2009)
"These Beasts" (from The Magazine of Fantasy & Science Fiction v. 88, no. 6, June 1995)
"Two Lions, a Witch, and the War-Robe" (from Swords & Dark Magic: The New Sword and Sorcery, June 2010)
"A Tower of Arkrondurl" (from Legends: Stories in honour of David Gemmell, Oct. 2013)
"The Woman in Scarlet" (from Realms of Fantasy v. 6, no. 4, Apr. 2000)
"Evillo the Uncunning" (from Songs of the Dying Earth: Stories in Honor of Jack Vance, 2009)

References

2021 short story collections
Fantasy short story collections
Short story collections by Tanith Lee
DMR Books books